William Ernest "Ernie" Smith served one term as mayor of Murray, Utah from 1946-1947.  He preferred to be known as Ernest or Ernie to differentiate between him and his father. Ernest was son of local businessman William Smith who owned the Murray Meat and Grocery store (later Smith Market) and whom later oversaw the store.

He was president of the Murray School District board, a member of the Murray fire department since 1910, ex- president of the Utah State Firemen’s Association and past president of the Murray Lions Club.

He served as vice-president of the International Fire Chiefs Association, which was rare for a volunteer fire chief at that time. Murray City used volunteer firemen until the latter half of the twentieth century.

He died in a nursing home in 1973.

References 

American firefighters
Mayors of Murray, Utah
1890 births
1973 deaths
20th-century American politicians